The 2012–13 Big 12 men's basketball season began with practices in October 2012, followed by the start of the regular-season in November. Conference play began in early January 2013 and concluded in March with the 2013 Big 12 men's basketball tournament at the Sprint Center in Kansas City. This was the first season in the Big 12 for two former Mountain West and Big East teams, as the TCU Horned Frogs and the West Virginia Mountaineers, respectively, played their first seasons in the conference.

Preseason

() first place votes

Pre-Season All-Big 12 Teams

Player of the Year: Pierre Jackson, Baylor
Newcomer of the Year: Amath M'Baye, Oklahoma
Freshman of the Year: Marcus Smart, Oklahoma State

Rankings

Conference Schedules

Conference matrix
This table summarizes the head-to-head results between teams in conference play. (x) indicates games remaining this season.

Baylor

|-
!colspan=12 style="background:#003015; color:#FECB00;"| Big 12 Regular Season

|-
!colspan=12 style="text-align: center; background:#003015"|2013 Big 12 tournament 

|-
| colspan="12" | *Non-Conference Game. Rankings from AP poll. All times are in Central Time. (#) Number seeded with region.
|}

Iowa State

|-
!colspan=12 style=""| Big 12 Regular Season

|- 
!colspan=12 style=""| 2013 Big 12 Tournament
|-

|-

|-
| colspan="12" | *Non-Conference Game. Rankings from AP poll. All times are in Central Time. (#) Number seeded with region.
|}

Kansas

|-
!colspan=12 style="background:#0049AF; color:#F20030;"| Big 12 Regular Season

|-
!colspan=12 style="text-align: center; background:#0049AF"|2013 Big 12 tournament 

|-
| colspan="12" | *Non-Conference Game. Rankings from AP poll. All times are in Central Time. (#) Number seeded with region.
|}

Kansas State

|-
!colspan=12 style="background:#512888; color:#FFFFFF;"| Big 12 Regular Season

|-
!colspan=12 style="text-align: center; background:#512888"|2013 Big 12 tournament 

|-
| colspan="12" | *Non-Conference Game. Rankings from AP poll. All times are in Central Time. (#) Number seeded with region.
|}

Oklahoma

|-
!colspan=12 style="background:#960018; color:#FFFDD0;"| Big 12 Regular Season

|-
!colspan=12 style="text-align: center; background:#960018"|2013 Big 12 tournament 

|-
| colspan="12" | *Non-Conference Game. Rankings from AP poll. All times are in Central Time. (#) Number seeded with region.
|}

Oklahoma State

|-
!colspan=12 style="background:#000000; color:#FF6600;"| Big 12 Regular Season

|-
!colspan=12 style="text-align: center; background:#000000"|2013 Big 12 tournament 

|-
| colspan="12" | *Non-Conference Game. Rankings from AP poll. All times are in Central Time. (#) Number seeded with region.
|}

TCU

|-
!colspan=12 style="background:#520063; color:#FFFFFF;"| Big 12 Regular season

|-
!colspan=12 style="text-align: center; background:#520063"|2013 Big 12 tournament 

|-
| colspan="12" | *Non-conference game. Rankings from AP poll. All times are in Central Time. (#) Number seeded with region.
|}

Texas

|-
!colspan=12 style="background:#CC5500; color:#FFFFFF;"| Big 12 Regular Season

|-
!colspan=12 style="text-align: center; background:#CC5500"|2013 Big 12 tournament 

|-
| colspan="12" | *Non-Conference Game. Rankings from AP poll. All times are in Central Time. (#) Number seeded with region.
|}

Texas Tech

|-
!colspan=12 style="background:#CC0000; color:#000000;"| Big 12 Regular Season

|-
!colspan=12 style="text-align: center; background:#CC0000"|2013 Big 12 tournament 

|-
| colspan="12" | *Non-Conference Game. Rankings from AP poll. All times are in Central Time. (#) Number seeded with region.
|}

West Virginia

|-
!colspan=12 style="background:#003366; color:#FFCC00;"| Big 12 Regular Season

|-
!colspan=12 style="text-align: center; background:#003366"|2013 Big 12 tournament 

|-
| colspan="12" | *Non-Conference Game. Rankings from AP poll. All times are in Central Time. (#) Number seeded with region.
|}

Postseason

Big 12 tournament

  March 13–16, 2013– Big 12 Conference Basketball Tournament, Sprint Center, Kansas City, MO.

NCAA tournament

National Invitation tournament

College Basketball Invitational

NBA Draft
Several players from the conference declared early for the NBA draft. Several players were among the 60 players invited to the 2013 NBA Draft Combine. The following conference players were drafted:

 Ben McLemore, Sacramento Kings, 1st round, 7th overall
 Jeff Withey, Portland Trail Blazers, 2nd round, 39th overall
 Pierre Jackson, Philadelphia 76ers, 2nd round, 42nd overall
 Romero Osby, Orlando Magic, 2nd round, 51st overall

Honors and awards

All-Americans

All-Big 12 Awards and Teams
 Player of the Year: Marcus Smart, Oklahoma State
 Defensive Player of the Year: Jeff Withey, Kansas
 Newcomer of the Year: Will Clyburn, Iowa State
 Freshman of the Year: Marcus Smart, Oklahoma State
 Sixth Man Award: Tyrus McGee, Iowa State
 Scholar-Athlete of the Year: Melvin Ejim, Iowa State
 Coach of the Year: Bruce Weber, Kansas State

All-Big 12 First Team
 Ben McLemore, Kansas, G
 Jeff Withey, Kansas, C
 Rodney McGruder, Kansas State, G
 Romero Osby, Oklahoma, F
 Marcus Smart, Oklahoma State, G

All-Big 12 Second Team
 Pierre Jackson, Baylor, G
 Will Clyburn, Iowa State, G
 Travis Releford, Kansas, G
 Ángel Rodríguez, Kansas State, G
 Markel Brown, Oklahoma State, G

All-Big 12 Third Team
 Isaiah Austin, Baylor, C
 Melvin Ejim, Iowa State, F
 Amath M'Baye, Oklahoma, F
 Steven Pledger, Oklahoma, G
 Le'Bryan Nash, Oklahoma State, G/F

All-Big 12 Honorable Mention
 Cory Jefferson (Baylor)
 Korie Lucious (Iowa State)
 Tyrus McGee (Iowa State)
 Elijah Johnson (Kansas)
 Shane Southwell (Kansas State)
 Michael Cobbins (Oklahoma State)
 Jaye Crockett (Texas Tech)
 Eron Harris (West Virginia)
 Deniz Kilicli (West Virginia)

Big 12 All-Defensive Team
 Chris Babb, Iowa State, G
 Travis Releford, Kansas, G
 Jeff Withey, Kansas, C
 Angel Rodriguez, Kansas State, G
 Michael Cobbins, Oklahoma State, F
 Marcus Smart, Oklahoma State, G

Big 12 All-Rookie Team
 Isaiah Austin, Baylor, C
 Will Clyburn, Iowa State, G
 Georges Niang, Iowa State, F
 Ben McLemore, Kansas, G
 Amath M'Baye, Oklahoma, F
 Marcus Smart, Oklahoma State, G

References

External links
 Big 12 Men's Basketball